An autonomy referendum was held in North Macedonia on 7 November 2004. Voters were asked whether they approved of overturning the municipal redistricting plans that gave greater autonomy to ethnic Albanians following the Ohrid Agreement that ended the 2001 conflict between ethnic Albanian militants and the predominantly ethnic Macedonian government forces. These had been changed to give ethnic Albanians greater control in districts where they had significant presence and gives local authorities greater control over education, health and development. It also reduced the number of municipalities from 123 to 84.

Although 95% voted in favour of the change, the voter turnout of 27% was well below the 50% threshold, resulting in it failing.

Background
The referendum was initiated by the World Macedonian Congress, led by Todor Petrov, whose "group of Voters" party won 0.25% of the vote in the 1998 parliamentary election. It was backed by conservative parties, notably VMRO-DPMNE, and non-Albanian ethnic minority parties. Backers were opposed to the Ohrid Accord and said the law was divisive and would lead to the breakup of the Republic of Macedonia.

The then Prime Minister, Hari Kostov said he would quit if the referendum succeeded and urged voters to boycott the vote, so it would fail to meet the 50% turnout requirement.

The European Union and United States also urged a boycott, and said that accession to the EU and NATO would be more difficult. Four days before the vote the United States announced they would start referring to the country as the Republic of Macedonia rather than the former Yugoslav Republic of Macedonia in a move said to strengthen the government position.

Prior to the vote, a Macedonian newspaper carried a story suggesting that if the referendum succeeded, Albanian militants had planned to blow up a pipeline carrying water to the capital Skopje.

Opinion polls prior to the vote suggested support of between 56 and 65% of voters.

Question

Results

References

 
Autonomy referendums
2004
Autonomy referendum
2004 referendums
November 2004 events in Europe